Lynn James (born January 25, 1965) is a former American football wide receiver. He played for the Cincinnati Bengals from 1990 to 1991, the Cleveland Browns in 1991 and for the Winnipeg Blue Bombers in 1992.

References

1967 births
Living people
American football wide receivers
SMU Mustangs football players
Arizona State Sun Devils football players
Cincinnati Bengals players
Cleveland Browns players
Winnipeg Blue Bombers players